Protein ariadne-2 homolog is a protein that in humans is encoded by the ARIH2 gene.

Function

Clinical significance

References

External links

Further reading